The Local Government Area of Ethiope East is located in the center of Delta State, Nigeria . Although it is not directly adjacent to Asagba, Asamagidi, Orerokpe, Ovwori, Orhokpokpor, Eruemukohwarien, Ekrokpe, Ughelli, or Agbasa, these places are nearby. The local government of Ethiope East is home to three districts and 67 settlements. Agbon, Abraka, and Isiokolo are the districts in Ethiope East and Isiokolo is where the local government administration is headquartered.

It is clear that Ethiope East has contributed to the more than 520 languages spoken in Nigeria. Ethiope East, however, has a multilingual population. Urhobo is Ethiope's predominant language, nonetheless, other spoken languages include Yoruba, Igbo, and Itsekiri are among others. However, the indigenes of Delta state take pleasure in speaking 11 languages, while the majority of people resident in Delta state speak Igbo, Izon, Urhobo, Igala, and Itsekiri. Majority of Ethiope East population prefer to communicate with Nigerian Pidgin English since it is simple to comprehend.

There are 73 settlements in Ethiope East, however they all contain the 67 villages that are located in this local government area.

It has an area of 380.00 km and a population of 200,792 persons according to the 2006 census. The postal code of the area is 330.

References

Local Government Areas in Delta State